Richard John Whitney (born 24 June 1944), also known as John "Charlie" Whitney, John Whitney and Charlie Whitney, is an English rock guitarist and a founder member of the rock bands Family, Streetwalkers and Axis Point.

Career
Whitney was born in Skipton, West Riding of Yorkshire. He attended Leicester Art College in 1962. His first appearance was at Fleckney Village hall Leicester,  with his mates from Great Glen, Alistair Sutton, Tony Wilson and Arthur Sloper. The name of the band has escaped living memory, but may have been something to do with Jeans.  
Their second gig was cancelled due to snow and they never reformed.   He then formed his own band known as The Farinas. They played rhythm and blues, and featured Jim King on saxophone and vocals, bassist Tim Kirchin and drummer Harry Overnall. They performed songs by Chuck Berry and The Coasters before releasing the single "You'd Better Stop" in August 1964. Later, Ric Grech replaced Tim Kirchin and Roger Chapman joined as the principal lead singer, giving a heavier blues sound before renaming the band The Roaring Sixties.

During 1966, The Roaring Sixties were renamed Family and they replaced their drummer Overnall with Rob Townsend. The band issued its first single as Family entitled "Scene Through The Eye Of A Lens/Gypsy Woman" in 1967 and Family's debut album Music in a Doll's House followed in July 1968. Family's heavy, experimental rock music gained them a reputation as a progressive underground band.  By 1970, with the release of their albums A Song For Me and Anyway and an appearance at the third Isle of Wight Festival on 28 August 1970, Family was creating some of the fastest and loudest rock and the most intense acoustic music in the British underground scene. Although Family proved to be popular in UK and continental Europe, success in the US eluded them and in 1973 the group broke up.

Whitney's angular guitar passages on songs like "Drowned In Wine" and "Good News Bad News" were singled out by fans and critics as being essential to the Family sound.  He and Chapman wrote most of Family's songs together as a team. Whitney also composed two tracks, the instrumental "Summer '67" and the childlike folk song "Processions", about a small boy enjoying a day at the seashore.

Whitney then formed Streetwalkers with Chapman in 1973. This new band included vocalist and guitarist Bobby Tench, from The Jeff Beck Group and Hummingbird, future Iron Maiden drummer Nicko McBrain who later moved on to play with Pat Travers and bassist Jon Plotel. They signed to the Vertigo label, recording an album entitled Streetwalkers (1974). The band broke up in 1977, ending eleven years of the Whitney-Chapman musical partnership.

Whitney remained active in rock music. He reunited with Rob Townsend, his bandmate from Family, to form Axis Point in 1978. The line-up for this band included piano player Eddie Hardin, vocalist and guitarist Bobby Tench from Streetwalkers and former Taste bassist Richard McCracken. When Axis Point broke up in 1980, Whitney formed Los Racketeeros, a live unit which played blues and bluegrass music. Los Racketeeros recorded a debut album in 1995 with a line-up including Alan Rogers, Pete Tomlyn, and Tony Taylor. Whitney released a solo album in 1999, and played concerts with Robert A. Roberts, a singer-songwriter, vocalist, harmonica player and guitarist, who had been a founding member of the London Bluesband Roadhouse. They released a CD as The Whitney-Roberts Combo experimenting with folk music.

Whitney now lives in Mytilene on the island of Lesbos, Greece

Discography

Family

Albums
Music in a Doll's House Reprise (1968)
Family Entertainment Reprise (1969)
A Song For Me Reprise (1970)
Anyway Reprise (1971) US (United Artists Records)
Fearless Reprise (1971) US (United Artists Records)
Bandstand Reprise (1972) US (United Artists Records)
It's Only a Movie Raft (1973) US (United Artists Records)
Peel Sessions "Strange Fruit" (1989) US (United Artists Records)
BBC Radio 1 In Concert Windsong (1991)
Family Live Mystic (2003)
BBC Volume 1: 1968–1969 Hux (2004)
BBC Volume 2: 1970–1973 Hux (2004)

Singles
"Scene Through The Eye of A Lens" / "Gypsy Woman" Liberty (1967)
"Me My Friend" / "Hey Mr. Policeman" Reprise (1968)
"Second Generation Woman" / "Hometown"  Reprise' (1968)
"No Mules Fool" / "Good Friend Of Mine" Reprise (1969)
"Today" / "Song For Lots Reprise" Reprise (1970)
"Strange Band" / "The Weaver's Answer" / "Hung Up Down" Reprise (1970)
"In My Own Time" / "Seasons" Reprise (1971) (US b/w "Anyway" United Artists (1971))
"Burlesque" / "The Rockin' R's" Reprise (1972)
"My Friend The Sun" / "Glove" Reprise (1973)
"Boom Bang" / "Sweet Desiree" Raft (1973)
"Sweet Desiree" / "Drink To You" Raft (1973)

Compilation albums
 Old Songs New Songs Reprise (1971)
 Best Of Family Reprise (1974)
 From Past Archives Teldec (1980)
 Best Of Family Castle (1990)
 A's & B's Castle  (1992)
 A Family Selection Castle (2000)
 Roger Chapman, Family & Friends 5-CD boxset  Mystic (2006)

Chapman-Whitney
 Streetwalkers Reprise K 54017 (1974)

Streetwalkers

Albums
 Downtown Flyers Mercury LP SRM-1-1060 (US), Vertigo 6360 123 (1975)
 Red Card Mercury SMR-1-1083 (US), Vertigo 9102 010, Repertoire REP 4147-WP (CD) (1976)
 Vicious But Fair  Mercury LP SRM-1-1135 (US), Vertigo 9102 012(1977)
 Streetwalkers Live Vertigo 6641-703 (1977)
 Best of Streetwalkers Vertigo CD, CA, LP 846-661 (1990)
 BBC Radio One Live Windsong CD  (1995)

Singles
"Roxianna" / "Crack"  Reprise (1974)
"Raingame" / "Miller" Vertigo  (1975)
"Daddy Rolling Stone" / "Hole In Your Pocket" Vertigo (1976)
"Chilli Con Carne" / "But You're Beautiful"  Vertigo (1977)

Axis Point
Axis Point RCA (1979)
Boast of the Town RCA (1980)

References

Family (band) members
1944 births
Living people
People from Skipton
English rock guitarists
Streetwalkers members